Ahfir is a town in Berkane Province, Oriental, Morocco, adjacent the border with Algeria. According to the 2004 census, it has a population of 19,482. The name Ahfir refers to the stone quarry which was exploited in this village founded by Hubert Lyautey at the time of the French protectorate. This village, which is inhabited by Beni Iznassen, was the gateway to the French invasion by Lyautey in 1907 leading to the imposition of the French protectorate from 1912 until 1956.

The name Ahfir means "Hole" in Berberized Arabic and would refer either to the great war trenches that were dug in this territory located near the Moroccan-Algerian border before the construction of the city by Hubert Lyautey, or to the stone quarry that was exploited in this village at the time of the French protectorate (Martimprey-du-Kiss). The city is located on the territory of the Beni Khaled tribe, part of the Iznassen tribe.

References

Populated places in Berkane Province
Municipalities of Morocco